Karolis Babkauskas (born 18 March 1991) is a Lithuanian professional basketball player. He participated in the 2012 LKL Three–point Shootout, finishing in fourth place.

External links 
 Eurobasket.com profile
 FIBA.com profile

1991 births
Living people
Lithuanian men's basketball players
BC Lietkabelis players
Guards (basketball)